"Hopeless" is a song written by Alan Jeffreys and Doc Pomus and performed by Andy Williams.  The song reached #3 on the U.S. adult contemporary chart and #13 on the Billboard chart in 1963.  The song's B-side, "The Peking Theme (So Little Time)", reached #115 on the Billboard Hot 100.

References

1963 singles
Songs with lyrics by Doc Pomus
Andy Williams songs
Columbia Records singles
1963 songs